Explosions in the Sky is an American post-rock band from Texas. The quartet originally played under the name Breaker Morant, then changed to the current name in 1999. The band has garnered popularity beyond the post-rock scene for their elaborately developed guitar work, narratively styled instrumentals—what they refer to as "cathartic mini-symphonies"—and their enthusiastic and emotional live shows. They primarily play with three electric guitars and a drum kit, although band member Michael James will at times exchange his electric guitar for a bass guitar. The band has later added a fifth member to their live performances. The band's music is almost purely instrumental.

History
Originally called Breaker Morant, Explosions in the Sky was formed in Austin, Texas, in 1999. Drummer Chris Hrasky is from Rockford, Illinois, and the rest of the band hails from Midland, Texas. The new name of "Explosions in the Sky" came from a comment Hrasky made in reference to the noise or sight of fireworks when they left KVRX on the night they played their first set and recorded their first track, "Remember Me as a Time of Day", that would be released on a compilation. Their 2000 debut album, How Strange, Innocence, was locally distributed in the form of CD-Rs. Rehearsal footage is featured on the feature film Cicadas, which won an Austin Film Festival award.

Explosions in the Sky quickly gained a reputation for themselves among other established bands such as Lift to Experience. Temporary Residence Limited signed the band on the strength of their demo after only half a listen; the demo was submitted by fellow Austin band The American Analog Set with a brief note saying, "This totally fucking destroys."

They garnered a small amount of media attention with their second album, Those Who Tell the Truth Shall Die, Those Who Tell the Truth Shall Live Forever, due to rumors linking it to the September 11, 2001 attacks. The band denied any connection in interviews. The album art shows an airplane with the caption "This plane will crash tomorrow." There were false reports that the last track was called "This Plane Will Crash Tomorrow" and that the album was released on September 10, 2001; the concept had actually originated in 2000, and the album was officially released on September 4, 2001. Bassist Michael James was detained in an airport as a threat to security, and had to explain why his guitar contained the words "this plane will crash tomorrow".

The band also received a considerable amount of attention playing before large audiences as the opening act of Fugazi's spring 2002 US tour in support of The Argument.

The band released The Earth Is Not A Cold Dead Place in 2003 and this is generally considered their most famous album.  The album has been described as a concept album and was stated by guitarist Munaf Rayani as the band's attempt at love songs.

After being contacted by Brian Reitzell, Explosions in the Sky wrote the soundtrack for the 2004 film Friday Night Lights. Despite having access to rare equipment in the studio for that project, the band kept to their songwriting style in creating original material.

Their album The Rescue was written and recorded in eight days as part of the TRL Travels in Constants series. As such, the album was originally only available at the band's live shows.

Explosions in the Sky's fifth studio album, All of a Sudden I Miss Everyone, which debuted February 20, 2007, exists as both a one-disc version and a two-disc special edition featuring remixes by multiple artists.
The band began touring on February 19 in the U.S. and Canada.

On April 26, 2011, the band released their sixth studio album, Take Care, Take Care, Take Care.

They were one of the support acts for Nine Inch Nails on their North American leg of the Twenty Thirteen Tour in late 2013, alternating dates with Godspeed You! Black Emperor.

Musical style and characteristics
Although the band's music deviates from pop, Hrasky said that they have similar goals "like immediately grabbing your attention and getting to your emotions." Rayani said, "We don't consider ourselves post-rock at all; we consider ourselves a rock band."

In a post-show interview clip on Austin City Limits, guitarist Munaf Rayani said about their status as instrumentalists, "I mean, I think we discussed singing for half a second, and then it just kinda, we just dropped it. We just didn't go back to it because we were comfortable enough." Drummer Chris Hrasky added, "I think we just liked the idea of a band that there was not a leader or main songwriter, everyone sort of collaborating and has their own say. I don't think any of us want the sort of 'leader role', so a leaderless band is kind of the best option for us."

In popular culture
Most notably, Explosions in the Sky's music is heavily featured in the Friday Night Lights movie and television show. It is a common misconception that the band wrote and recorded the television show's theme song. Instead, it is an original composition by W. G. Snuffy Walden. Music by Explosions in the Sky has been used in several television programs and commercials: "The Birth and Death of the Day" for the BBC documentary Lost Land of the Jaguar, All the Real Girls, Shopgirl, One Tree Hill, Love the Beast and The Diving Bell and the Butterfly, as well as various songs for the PBS documentary The Street Stops Here. A number of One Tree Hill episodes are named after the band's songs.
 The song "It's Natural To Be Afraid" is featured in the narrative sports documentary series 24/7, "Mayweather vs. De La Hoya", and was also used in the season 8 finale of CSI: Crime Scene Investigation, "For Gedda (Part 1)".
 The song "Catastrophe and the Cure" is used during the intro to Get Collins, an Irish documentary on Michael Collins and the film Kaboom by director Gregg Araki in which the male lead is also given a signed copy of All of a Sudden I Miss Everyone as a birthday gift.
 In 2009, the song "First Breath After Coma" is used for the introduction of feature presentations on the television network, Versus. The song is also used in the trailer for the documentary Focus, directed by Steve Hwang. "First Breath After Coma", along with "Six Days at the Bottom of the Ocean", were featured in the 2010 film Kalamity.
 The song "The Only Moment We Were Alone" is shortly featured in Michael Moore's documentary Capitalism: A Love Story. It is also featured in the 2008 film Sleepwalking.
 The song "Your Hand in Mine" is featured in the films Friday Night Lights, The Big Empty, Love Happens, The King of Staten Island, the TV series Prisoners' Wives, the documentary Gideon's Army and the Cerveza Pacifico TV commercial "Anchors Up".
 The song "A Poor Man's Memory" is featured in the TV show Blue Mountain State.
 The song "Glittering Blackness" is featured in the film Ghosts of Girlfriends Past.
 The song "Six Days at the Bottom of the Ocean" is featured in the film Lunopolis.
 The song "So Long, Lonesome" is featured in the 2010 film Last Night.
 The song "An Ugly Fact of Life" was featured in the film adaptation of The Kite Runner.
 The song "Human Qualities" is featured in the 2012 film This Means War.
 The song "Trembling Hands" is featured on the 2012 video game Major League Baseball 2K12.
 The song "First Breath After Coma" is used for an Adidas commercial featuring Chicago Bulls player Derrick Rose, the end of the television series Doctors, the 2005 Israeli film Close to Home and in the first episode of John Bishop's Australia.
 The song "The Birth and Death of the Day" is used in the final scene of the mountain biking documentary Life Cycles
 The song "Waking Up" was featured in the film Lone Survivor.
 The song "Postcard From 1952" was used in the episode "Chicago" of Foo Fighters: Sonic Highways, and a snippet of the song is used in the Welcome to Night Vale episode "The September Monologues".
 The song "The Only Moment We Were Alone" was used in the teaser reveal of Street Fighter V.
 Along with David Wingo, Explosions in the Sky wrote the entire soundtrack to the 2013 comedy-drama film Prince Avalanche, starring Paul Rudd and Emile Hirsch. The idea itself came when the band proposed working on a film with director David Gordon Green.
 The band is filmed performing "Last Known Surroundings" for Terrance Malick's 2015 film Knight of Cups.
 The song "Remember Me as a Time of Day" was used in the 2015 film Me and Earl and the Dying Girl.
 Their song "The Birth and Death of the Day" was used at the end of the 2015 mountaineering documentary Meru.
 Their song "Logic of a Dream" was used in the trailer of the 2016 film Deepwater Horizon.
 Their song "The Ecstatics" was used in the 2017 film Power Rangers.
 Austin-based movie theater chain Alamo Drafthouse Cinema uses "Wilderness" in their Feature Presentation bumper.

Band members
 Chris Hrasky – drums
 Michael James – guitar, bass, keyboards.
 Munaf Rayani – guitar, keyboards, percussion.
 Mark Smith – guitar, synthesizer.

Touring musicians
 Jay Demko – bass, guitar, keyboards, percussion

Former touring musicians
 Carlos Torres 
 David Wingo

Discography

Studio albums
 How Strange, Innocence (2000)
 Those Who Tell the Truth Shall Die, Those Who Tell the Truth Shall Live Forever (2001)
 The Earth Is Not a Cold Dead Place (2003)
 The Rescue (2005)
 All of a Sudden I Miss Everyone (2007)
 Take Care, Take Care, Take Care (2011)
 The Wilderness (2016)

Soundtracks
 Friday Night Lights (2004)
 Prince Avalanche (2013)
 Lone Survivor (2013)
 Manglehorn (2014)
 Big Bend (An Original Soundtrack for Public Television) (2021)

Compilations
 "Remember Me as a Time of Day" on Refurbished Robots (1999)
 "The Long Spring" on Thank You (TRR50) (2004), Temporary Residence Limited
 "Welcome Ghosts" sampler on Destroy Independent Music! (2007), Temporary Residence Limited
 "First Breath After Coma" on Friday Night Lights (television soundtrack) (2007), Adrenaline Records
 "Your Hand in Mine" on The Steel People (2009)
 "Your Hand in Mine" on the Love Happens soundtrack (2009)
 "You Knew Joe?" on the Joe soundtrack (2013)
 "Remember Me as a Time of Day" on the Me and Earl and the Dying Girl soundtrack (2015)

Singles
 "A Song for Our Fathers" (2000)
 "Last Known Surroundings" (2011)
 "Be Comfortable, Creature" (2011)
 "Postcard from 1952" (2011)
 "The Ecstatics" (2017)

See also
 List of post-rock bands

References

External links

 
 Explosions in the Sky at the Internet Archive's Live Music Archive
 
 Podcast of Explosions in the Sky's 2008 Lollapalooza performance
 Explosions in the Sky live show, 930 Club in DC at NPR.
 Explosions in the Sky interview with Chris Hrasky at Ground Control.
 Explosions in the Sky interview at Webcuts (February 2008)

Rock music groups from Texas
Musical groups established in 1999
American post-rock groups
Musical groups from Austin, Texas
1999 establishments in Texas
Bella Union artists
Temporary Residence Limited artists